Selenochlamys is a genus of predatory air-breathing land slugs, shell-less pulmonate gastropod mollusks in the family Trigonochlamydidae.

Species
Species within the genus Selenochlamys include:
 Selenochlamys pallida Boettger, 1883 - the type species
 Selenochlamys ysbryda Rowson & Symondson, 2008

References

External links
 Selenochlamys at AnimalBase

Trigonochlamydidae